Senator Hankins may refer to:

Freeman Hankins (1917–1988), Pennsylvania State Senate
Shirley Hankins (born 1931), Washington State Senate